Walton Cantonment is a cantonment area situated in Lahore, Punjab, Pakistan. It is named after Sir Cusach Walton, son of Frederick Walton.

History
Lahore Cantonment with its increasing population and extensions to the boundaries had become difficult to manage and in 1998 it was bifurcated into two administrative divisions, Lahore Cantonment and the new Walton Cantonment.

According to the Zoning Plan of Walton Cantt. Area, the cantonment is spread over 10,000 acres. The estimated population is about 700,000.

Education
 Civil Services Academy

Neighbourhoods
 Cavalry Ground

Walton railway station

Walton railway station is a railway station located in Walton Cantontment. It is one of the urban stations of the city which are served by commuter trains of Lahore. A large number of commuters use this station to get access to the city of Lahore.

References

External links
 Official Website of Walton Cantonment Board

Cantonments of Pakistan
Military in Lahore